OVFL may refer to:

 Ontario Varsity Football League, a Canadian football league
 Ohio Valley Football League